Kinesin-like protein KIF1C is a protein that in humans is encoded by the KIF1C gene.
Kif1C is a fast, plus-end directed microtubule motor. It takes processive 8nm steps along microtubules and can generate forces of up to 5 pN.  Kif1C transports α5β1-integrins in human cells. Kif1C has been shown to be non-essential in mouse with other proteins able to perform the same function. However, mutations in KIF1C lead to spastic paraplegia and cerebellar dysfunction in humans. These mutations usually result in a total loss of the protein or (partial) loss of function, such as significant lower force output.

Interactions 

KIF1C has been shown to interact with PTPN21 and YWHAG. KIF1C is a dimeric molecule that is held in an autoinhibited state by interaction of its stalk with the microtubule binding interface of the motor domain. Upon binding of PTPN21 or the cargo adapter HOOK3 to the KIF1C stalk, the motor domain is released, engages with microtubules and commences transport.

References

Further reading

External links 
 

Molecular biology
Motor proteins
Human genes
Human proteins